Vasil Mirchev (23 March 1927 – 9 January 2003) was a Bulgarian film director. He directed nine films between 1965 and 1986. His 1969 film Tango was entered into the 6th Moscow International Film Festival.

Selected filmography
 Tango (1969)

References

External links

1927 births
2003 deaths
Bulgarian film directors
Film people from Plovdiv